Nancowry Subdivision is one of three local administrative divisions of the Indian district of Nicobar, part of the Indian union territory of Andaman and Nicobar Islands.

Administration
It includes 4 taluks:
 Nancowrie taluk
 Kamorta taluk
 Teressa and Chowra taluk
 Katchal taluk

References 

Nicobar district